NHK Newsline (stylized as NHK NEWSLiNE, formerly and also simply known as Newsline) ( NHK Nyūsurain) is a foreign news program aired on NHK's international broadcasting service NHK World TV. This program broadcasts on the hour, 24 hours a day.

History
NHK Newsline started as Day Line Japan in April 1997, with a length of 10 minutes, and airing several times a day. In 2000, the program's name was changed to Newsline. The English spoken portions of the program would gradually expand with time.

On January 30, 2009, News Watch 9 - an English-dubbed news program - was removed from the NHK World line-up. On February 2, 2009, Newsline was re-formatted in order to fill the gap left by News Watch 9, by changing to a news and information program. Newsline's time slot also changed to air at the top of every hour, 24 times a day. The length of the program was typically 30 minutes during the week, and 10 minutes on weekends and Japanese holidays. The program has been referred to as NHK Newsline since Late March 2016.

On April 1, 2019, NHK Newsline changed to a 15-20 minute format on weekdays at most times, while other Newsline-branded programs fill the remaining time until the bottom of the hour. These include Newsline In Depth, which features a variety of feature stories, and Newsline Biz, with business news. Newsline is replaced by the daily news program Newsroom Tokyo on weekdays, except holidays, at 20:00 JST (replaying at 3:00 JST the following morning).

On March 30, 2020, NHK implemented a new policy for referring to Japanese names, following the common practice in the Japanese language of listing the surname first followed by the given name. The new policy extends to all of NHK's English-language programming, including NHK Newsline. For example, Shinzō Abe (the former Prime Minister) is referred to as Abe Shinzō under the new policy.

Format
NHK Newsline updates viewers on the latest hard news with a focus mainly on Japan, the rest of Asia, and then finally around the world. Some editions feature segments focusing on Southeast Asia hosted by an anchor based in Bangkok. Feature segments follow, with business news and a global weather forecast. NHK Newsline is anchored by established NHK news presenters. The anchors speak entirely in English. English dubbing or occasional English subtitling if needed (previously just English subtitles until after 2011) are used in video footage when the spoken language is other than English. All measurements, including temperatures, are given in metric. Monetary figures are measured in Japanese yen, and figures in United States dollars are often also included. During periods of breaking news, Newsline is usually extended past its normal time slot.

Anchors and reporters

News
Weekdays (15–minute program)
08:00 JST/23:00 UTC - 12:00 JST/02:00 UTC Kyoko Tashiro  / Hiroaki Yamaguchi (every other week)
13:00 JST/03:00 UTC - 18:00 JST/09:00 UTC Rika Kawasaki / Miki Yamamoto / Erika Morishita /  
19:00 JST/10:00 UTC - 07:00 JST/22:00 UTC Raja Pradhan / Yoshi Ogasawara (every other week)

Weekends (10-minute program)
08:00 JST/23:00 UTC - 12:00 JST/02:00 UTC Keiko Kitagawa 
13:00 JST/03:00 UTC - 19:00 JST/10:00 UTC Gene Otani / Ramin Mellegard / Kanako Sachno
20:00 JST/11:00 UTC - 07:00 JST/22:00 UTC Ross Mihara

National holidays, New Year's Day or end of year  (10-minute program)
08:00 JST/23:00 UTC - 12:00 JST/02:00 UTC  Miki Yamamoto / Keiko Kitagawa
13:00 JST/03:00 UTC - 07:00 JST/22:00 UTC Kanako Sachno / Yoshi Ogasawara / Raja Pradhan

Politics
 Masayo Nakajima - Senior political commentator / deputy editor-in-chief NHK's Tokyo HQ
 Akihiro Mikoda - Senior political / economics commentator
 Shogo Takahashi - NHK World Executive Producer 
 Takashi Ichinose - Special Affairs commentator / NHK's Tokyo HQ
 Miki Ebara - editor-in-chief, NHK's Washington Bureau
 Mayuko Ambe - Politics reporter
 Tomoko Kamata - Politics reporter
 Kimberly Gale - Politics reporter (freelance work for CBC News / NHK World)
 Kim Chan-ju - NHK Seoul Bureau

Business
(all times listed are in Japanese Standard Time) 
 Akiko Okamoto - Reporter
 Gene Otani - Anchor / Presenter, Newsline Asia 24 and Direct Talk
 Shaula Vogue - Reporter / Presenter, Biz Stream and Design Talks Plus 
 Ramin Mellegard - Anchor / Presenter, Newsline Biz and Newsline Asia 24

Weather
 Sayaka Mori - meteorologist for Newsroom Tokyo and other Newsline programs till 2:00 JST 
 Jonathan Oh - meteorologist for Newsroom Tokyo and other Newsline programs till 2:00 JST
 Tsietsei Monare - meteorologist for Newsline Asia 24 and other Newsline programs till 20:00 JST
 Yoko Komagata - meteorologist for Newsline Asia 24 and other Newsline programs till 20:00 JST

Irregular anchors 

 Yuko Fukushima - business anchor for Newsroom Tokyo (previously as regular anchor from 2009 to 2012)

Other anchors 
 Catherine Kobayashi, NHK New York Bureau, anchors NHK Newsline from New York, alternating weekdays from 08:00-12:00 JST
 Minori Takao, NHK New York Bureau, anchors NHK Newsline from New York, alternating weekdays from 08:00-12:00 JST
 Dhra Dhirakaosal, NHK Bangkok Bureau, also reports for Newsline Asia 24 and Newsroom Tokyo (primarily on Thursdays & Fridays)
 Cholaphansa Narula, NHK Bangkok Bureau, also reports for Newsline Asia 24 and Newsroom Tokyo (Mostly Tuesdays)
 Roselyn Debhavalya, NHK Bangkok Bureau, also reports for Newsline Asia 24 and Newsroom Tokyo (Primarily Mondays & Wednesdays)
 Aiko Doden, Presenter, Newsline In Depth and NHK Special Affairs commentator
 Marie Yanaka, Presenter, Newsline in Depth and Business reporter
 Yoko Nishimura, anchors NHK Newsline one Sunday per month from 1100 UTC - 2200 UTC

Former on-air Staff
 Hiro Morita - Anchor (departed in 2022)
 Ai Uchida -  Anchor (departed in 2021)
 James Tengan -  Anchor (departed in 2020, Currently narrates NHK World Japan's Program Tokyo Fashion Express)
 Carley Gomez - Meteorologist (departed in 2019; now at KXTV-TV Sacramento, California)
 Robert Speta - Meteorologist (departed in 2017; now at WTLV-TV  Jacksonvile, Florida)
 Mai Shoji - Meteorologist (departed in 2015; now at Tokyo FM)
 Ron Madison - Business Anchor (departed in 2015)
 Yuko Aotani - Anchor (departed in 2015)
 John LaDue - Reporter / TSE Broadcasts 
 Phoebe Amoroso - Reporter/ TSE Broadcasts 
 Sherry Ann Jisu - Anchor (departed in 2015; now at Bloomberg Television)
 Miwa Gardner - Meteorologist (departed in 2012; now at Google)

Ratings
NHK Newsline is rated as one of the top English–language news programs in the Asia Pacific region. NHK Newsline competes in the Asian news market with China's CCTV-9 News on CGTN; South Korea's Arirang News on Arirang TV; Singapore's Asia Now on CNA; various news programs like Rundown and The World Tonight on the ABS-CBN News Channel from the Philippines; and Australia Network News on the Australia Network. In the United States, NHK Newsline airs on the PBS World Channel at 2:00pm Pacific Time Zone on weekdays and on Link TV daily.

See also
 BBC World News, top of the hour daily newscast aired on BBC World News
 DW News, top of the hour daily newscast aired on DW-TV
 Newshour, top of the hour daily newscast aired on Al Jazeera English

References

Footnotes

External links
 
 NHK World TV Anchors and Reporters

Japanese television news shows
2000 Japanese television series debuts
2000s Japanese television series
2010s Japanese television series
2020s Japanese television series
NHK original programming